Hans Leistikow was a German general during the Second World War.

Biography
In August 1895, Hans Leistikow was born in Metz in Alsace-Lorraine. He fought during the First World War and made a military career in the German army. Senior Officer at the beginning of World War II, Leistikow participated in the battle of France. After various assignments, Hans Leistikow was appointed Feldkommandeur of Laval (Feldkommandantur 582) in June 1944. While German troops retreated in front of the victorious US Army, Leistikow was promoted to the grade of Generalmajor on 1 October 1944. He was captured shortly after.

Hans Leistikow died in 1967, at Krautheim, Baden-Württemberg.

Decorations
 Iron Cross of 1914, 1st and 2nd class
 Knight's Cross of the Royal House Order of Hohenzollern with Swords
 Wound Badge (1918) in Black
 Hanseatic Cross of Hamburg

References

Sources 
 Die Generale des Heeres 1921–1945.

External links 
 Hans Leistikow on Das Lexikon der Deutschen Generale 

1895 births
1967 deaths
Military personnel from Metz
People from Alsace-Lorraine
German Army personnel of World War I
Major generals of the German Army (Wehrmacht)
Reichswehr personnel